Elter Water is a small lake that lies half a mile (800 m) south-east of the village of Elterwater. Both are situated in the valley of Great Langdale in the English Lake District.

The lake is 1030 yd (930 m) long and varies in width up to a maximum of 350 yd (320 m), covering an area of 0.06 mi2 (0.15 km2). The River Brathay which provides outflow from Elter Water flows south to join Windermere, near Ambleside.

Etymology
The name Elterwater means either 
Lake of the Swan (" 'The lake frequented by swans', from Old Norse 'elptr'/'alpt' 'swan', in the genitive sing.[ular] form with '-ar', and 'water', probably replacing Old Norse 'vatn' 'lake'. Whooper swans still winter on the lake") 
or Lake of Alder.

Ecology
The lake is a Site of Special Scientific Interest, but there have been problems with water quality, in particular eutrophication.
Navigation is prohibited on the lake.

Cultural references
Thomas Frederick Worrall painted a watercolour of the lake with Langdale Pikes in the background. This painting is hanging in the Bishop's House, Keswick.

References

Bibliography

External links
Elterwater Park

Lakes of the Lake District
Sites of Special Scientific Interest in Cumbria
Westmorland
South Lakeland District